Noyoner Alo (English: Eyesight) is a 1984 Bangladeshi film starring Zafar Iqbal, Kajori, Subarna Mustafa, Raisul Islam Asad, Prabir Mitra and Anwar Hossain and directed by Baby Islam. The film was remade into Bengali India in 1998 with the same title. Baby Islam garnered Bangladesh National Film Award for Best Cinematographer. Samina Chowdhury earned Bachsas Award for Best Female Playback Singer.

Soundtrack

Awards 
Bangladesh National Film Awards
Best Cinematographer – Baby Islam

Bachsas Awards
Best Female Playback Singer – Samina Chowdhury

References

1984 films
Bengali-language Bangladeshi films
Films scored by Ahmed Imtiaz Bulbul
1980s Bengali-language films